Blackpool Pleasure Beach railway station serves the Blackpool Pleasure Beach theme park. It is the penultimate station before Blackpool South on the Blackpool South to Colne line.

History
The station opened on 13 April 1987 at a cost of £58,000. This cost was met by Blackpool Pleasure Beach Company (£31,000), British Rail (£15,000), Lancashire County Council (£10,000) and Blackpool Borough Council (£2,000).

The station has only one platform and is unstaffed.

The station is on the same site as Burlington Road Halt which was open for a railmotor service between 1913 and 1939.

Facilities
Though unstaffed, it has been provided with a ticket machine in the main platform waiting shelter and digital information screen to supply train running information (this can also been obtained from timetable posters, a pay phone and a digital P.A system).  Step-free access is available from the adjacent street.

Services
The typical off-peak service from the station is:
1tph (train per hour) to 
1tph to

References

External links

 Blackpool & Fylde Rail Users’ Association—Pleasure Beach, accessed 17 October 2007

Blackpool Pleasure Beach
Railway stations in Blackpool
DfT Category F1 stations
Former Preston and Wyre Joint Railway stations
Railway stations in Great Britain opened in 1913
Railway stations in Great Britain closed in 1915
Railway stations in Great Britain opened in 1920
Railway stations in Great Britain closed in 1939
Railway stations opened by British Rail
Railway stations in Great Britain opened in 1987
Northern franchise railway stations
1913 establishments in England